"Crystal Blue Persuasion" is a 1969 song originally recorded by Tommy James and the Shondells and composed by Eddie Gray, Tommy James and Mike Vale.

Background
A gentle-tempoed groove, "Crystal Blue Persuasion" was built around a prominent organ part with an understated arrangement, more akin to The Rascals' sound at the time than to James's contemporary efforts with psychedelic rock. It included melodic passages for an acoustic guitar, as well as a bass pattern, played between the bridge and the third verse of the song.

In a 1985 interview in Hitch magazine, James said the title of the song came to him while he was reading the Biblical Book of Revelation:
I took the title from the Book of Revelations [sic] in the Bible, reading about the New Jerusalem. The words jumped out at me, and they're not together; they're spread out over three or four verses. But it seemed to go together, it's my favorite of all my songs and one of our most requested.

According to James's manager, James was actually inspired by his readings of the Book of Ezekiel, which (he remembered as) speaking of a blue Shekhinah light that represented the presence of the Almighty God, and of the Book of Isaiah and Book of Revelation, which tell of a future age of brotherhood of mankind, living in peace and harmony.

At the time of the song's release there were several popular types of high quality blue-colored LSD tablets in circulation—some listeners generally assumed James was referring to "acid".  In 1979, music writer Dave Marsh described it as "a transparent allegory about James' involvement with amphetamines."

Chart performance
When released as a single in June 1969, "Crystal Blue Persuasion" became one of the biggest hits for the group, peaking at number two on the Billboard pop singles chart for three weeks behind Zager and Evans's single "In the Year 2525". In Canada, the song spent one week at number one. The single version differs from the album version of the song with horn overdubs added to the mix and a longer bongos overdub before the third verse.

A music video was made which showed various scenes of late 1960s political and cultural unrest and imagery of "love and peace".

Chart history

Weekly charts

Year-end charts

Cover versions
Tito Puente, Joe Bataan, The Heptones, Morcheeba, Concrete Blonde, Jack Wagner, and John Wesley Harding are among those who have covered the song.

Appearances in popular culture
"Crystal Blue Persuasion" has been used in numerous media and entertainment properties, both onscreen and off.

"Crystal Blue Persuasion" has appeared in the films A Walk on the Moon (1999), The Secret Life of Girls (1999), Zodiac (2007), The Nanny Diaries (2007), and the TV show How to Make it in America (2010). The song is also featured in the movie The Expendables 2 (2012), while Barney (Sylvester Stallone) is flying his plane. The song was played during the pool scene in the TV movie Growing Up Brady, and was in the pilot episode of The Wonder Years.

The song is referenced in Marvel Comics' Fantastic Four Annual (Vol. 1, #21) from 1988. The name references the character in the book, Crystalia Amaquelin, the blue area of the moon where part of the story takes place, and the plotline which is formed around coercing Crystal to return to the Inhumans.

The title of the song is referenced in the song "He Do the Police in Different Voices", the opening track from the 1993 album Plants and Birds and Rocks and Things  by The Loud Family.

The principal riff of the song is sampled in the song "Sabbatical" by German nu jazz group De-Phazz, from their 2001 album Death by Chocolate.

In 2012, "Crystal Blue Persuasion" was used in the eighth episode of the fifth season of Breaking Bad, "Gliding Over All", during a montage depicting the process involved to bring main character Walter White's methamphetamine operation and its signature blue crystal meth to an international level. This montage was subsequently parodied as the opening scene in The Simpsons season 24, episode 17 "What Animated Women Want". The song is also referenced in the title of the season 30 finale “Crystal Blue-Haired Persuasion”, in which a segment of the song is played. The Breaking Bad montage was again parodied in Bordertown season 1, episode 2, "Borderwall" during a montage featuring Bud Buckwald and Steve Hernandez (Bud's boss at the Border Patrol station) running an illegal smuggling tunnel.

References

External links
 Lyrics of this song
 

1969 songs
1969 singles
Songs written by Tommy James
Tommy James and the Shondells songs
Roulette Records singles
Soul ballads
Songs about drugs
RPM Top Singles number-one singles
1960s ballads
Rock ballads